Lost Souls is the debut studio album by American rapper and singer Vory. It was released on June 3, 2022, through UMG Recordings and Dream Chasers Records. The album features guest appearances from notable artists such as Kanye West, BLEU, NAV, BEAM, Landstrip Chip, and Fresco Trey. It has two singles: "Do Not Disturb" featuring BLEU and NAV which was released on May 13, 2022, and "Daylight" featuring Kanye West.

Track listing

References

Hip hop albums by American artists
2022 debut albums
Universal Music Group albums